José Salinas Morán (born 30 September 2000) is a Valencian footballer who plays as a left back for CD Mirandés, on loan from Elche CF.

Club career
Born in Callosa de Segura, Alicante, Valencian Community, Salinas joined Elche CF's youth setup in 2018, from Kelme CF. He made his senior debut with the reserves on 22 September 2019, starting in a 4–0 Tercera División home routing of Novelda CF.

Salinas scored his first senior goal on 29 February 2020, netting his team's only in a 1–3 home loss against Villarreal CF C. He made his first team debut on 6 January of the following year, starting in a 1–0 away win against CF La Nucía, for the season's Copa del Rey.

Salinas' professional debut occurred on 16 January 2021, as he started in a 0–2 loss at Rayo Vallecano, also for the national cup. On 21 August, he extended his contract for a further year and was loaned to Primera División RFEF side Unionistas de Salamanca CF.

On 30 July 2022, Salinas moved to Segunda División side CD Mirandés on loan for the season.

References

External links

2000 births
Living people
People from Vega Baja del Segura
Sportspeople from the Province of Alicante
Spanish footballers
Footballers from the Valencian Community
Association football defenders
Primera Federación players
Tercera División players
Elche CF Ilicitano footballers
Elche CF players
Unionistas de Salamanca CF players
CD Mirandés footballers